Franckensteina Strataemontanus is the sixth studio album by Dutch symphonic black metal band Carach Angren. Released on 26 June 2020 through Season of Mist, it is a concept album inspired by the life of late 17th-century/early 18th-century German occultist Johann Konrad Dippel, whose controversial experiments with corpses allegedly inspired Mary Shelley's influential 1818 Gothic novel Frankenstein; or, The Modern Prometheus; its title is a reference to a Latin epithet adopted by Dippel later in life. It is also their final release with long-time drummer and founding member Ivo "Namtar" Wijers, who left the band as soon as the recording sessions ended citing "dissatisfactions with the music industry".

Background
Carach Angren announced through their social media in late 2019 that they began work on a new studio album, scheduled to come out through Season of Mist in mid-2020. On 20 February 2020 the album's title, cover art and tracklist were unveiled, and the song "Monster" was released in advance on 11 March followed by "Der Vampir von Nürnberg" on 24 April and "Operation Compass" on 26 May. A deluxe version containing a bonus track was also announced.

A music video for the title track "Franckensteina Strataemontanus" was released on 10 November 2020.

Originally slated to come out on 29 May 2020, the release date was later pushed to 26 June as a consequence of the COVID-19 pandemic.

Reception
The album has received generally positive reviews upon its release. Dom Lawson of Blabbermouth.net rated it with an 8 out of 10, stating that "Franckensteina Strataemontanus feels like a very clear and belligerent demonstration of how sophisticated [Carach Angren's] identity has become", and that even though "black metal purists will probably flinch from this band's overt stylishness and taste for the vivid colors of widescreen horror" and "its sole downside is the fact that we can't currently watch this stuff unfolding on a stage", "that never stopped lots of other bands from being hugely successful. Carach Angren are playing to the ghoulish gallery, but it'll be standing room only soon enough". Elliot Leaver of Distorted Sound rated it with a 7 out of 10, writing that "[T]his is a very fun record, and one that serves as a very fitting swansong for Carach Angren's departing drummer. As the band continue on as a duo, they will look to build on their growing success and Franckensteina Strataemontanus is the album to do just that. It's not going to finish close to the top of End of Year lists, but it's certainly worth a number of spins". Chris Dick of Decibel wrote of the album very positively, comparing it to a piece by Benjamin Wallfisch.

Dr. A. N. Grier of Angry Metal Guy gave a slightly more mixed review, rating it with a 3 out of 5 and stating that "[W]hile Franckensteina Strataemontanus captivates me with its story, it doesn't fully captivate me musically. 'Monster' and 'Franckensteina Strataemontanus' are my favorites because they're concise, display control, and contribute in a big way to the classic Frankenstein story. 'The Necromancer' is a massive contributor as well. Especially the infamous line, 'It's alive!'. But it's not a standout track. And 'Operation Compass' has nothing to do with the story. Which confuses me greatly. That said, if you're looking for more horror in these uncertain times, Franckensteina Strataemontanus is for you". Another mixed review came from Didrik Mešiček of Tuonela Magazine, who wrote: "[A]dmittedly, this was a hard review to write. I struggle to say anything bad about the actual music, but I just don't feel this album. It's not the Carach Angren I fell in love with, but there's a case to be made about Ardek's orchestrations being better than ever. Somehow it all still feels uninspired though and overall it's definitely my least favorite album from the Dutch trio so far"; he also noticed the band seems to be departing from black metal ever since their 2017 album Dance and Laugh Amongst the Rotten.

Track listing

Personnel
Carach Angren
Dennis "Seregor" Droomers – guitars, lead vocals
Clemens "Ardek" Wijers – keyboards, guitars, bass, backing vocals
Ivo "Namtar" Wijers – drums

Additional musicians
Nikos Mavridis – violin (tracks 5 and 10)

Team
Stefan Heilemann/Heilemania – cover artwork
Patrick Damiani (Tidal Wave Studio) – engineering (drums, guitars, bass)
Robert Carranza – mixing, mastering

Charts

References

2020 albums
Concept albums
Carach Angren albums
Season of Mist albums
Albums postponed due to the COVID-19 pandemic